Diaphorocera is a genus of blister beetles belonging to the family Meloidae. The genus contains 10 species. All species are restricted to Saharo-Sindian regions such as Palestine and Israel, Northern Africa, southern Iran and Arabian Peninsula.

All members have metallic green-blue body, extremely modified male antennae and yellow-orange colored legs, antennae and mouthparts.

Taxonomy
In 1895, Bedel published the first key to the species Diaphorocera and it was revised by Zoltán Kaszab in 1951. In 1954 and 1983 Kocher and Kaszab respectively described one new species and one new subspecies. Phylogenetic relationships of Diaphorocera within Cerocomini were never defined. Kaszab division to genera was based on the base of the number of antennomeres.

Species
 Diaphorocera carinicollis
 Diaphorocera chrysoprasis
 Diaphorocera hemprichi
 Diaphorocera hemprichi hemprichi
 Diaphorocera hemprichi saudita
 Diaphorocera johnsoni
 Diaphorocera kerimii
 Diaphorocera neglecta
 Diaphorocera obscuritarsis
 Diaphorocera peyerimhoffi
 Diaphorocera promelaena
 Diaphorocera sicardi

References

Meloidae